Agabus aequalis is a species of predatory diving beetle belonging to the family Dytiscidae. This species inhabits rivers and bogs. It has been found in Transbaikal, Primorsky Krai, and Sakhalin in the Russian Far East, Jilin and Sichuan provinces, China, and Arkhangai and Övörkhangai provinces, Mongolia.

References

Agabus (beetle)
Beetles described in 1882
Insects of Russia
Insects of Mongolia
Insects of China